The Amber Sexalogy is a 2006 Malaysian compilation of six short films by Azharr Rudin. It premiered at the 2006 Singapore International Film Festival. It was distributed in Malaysia on DVD.

Synopsis 

Five out of the six shorts chronicle the various stages of a romantic affair between Amber (Melissa Maureen Rizal) and Harris/Man (who is played by three different actors: Gavin Yap, Mark Teh, Alvin Wong). The final short, Majidee, does not feature Amber but instead has Harris (Tora Andika) having a conversation with a man (Azman Hassan) while walking through Kuala Lumpur.

Production information

Azharr Rudin ... Writer/Director/Editor/Producer
Yasmin Ahmad ... Executive Producer
Rita Machdar ... Associate Producer
Amir Muhammad (director) ... Associate Producer
James Lee (Malaysian film director), Woo Ming Jin, Imri Nasution ... Camera
Duration: 61 min

Awards 
Best Short Film, Hawaii International Film Festival (2006)
Incentive Award, Akira Kurosawa Memorial Short Film Competition (2007) 
Special Mention Prize, Singapore Short Film Festival (2008)

External links
 The Amber Sexalogy on The Internet Movie Database.
 Trailer on YouTube
 Review by Benjamin McKay

Text 

2006 films
Malaysian anthology films
Malay-language films
English-language Malaysian films